Cherthala railway station (Code: SRTL) is a (NSG 5 Category) railway station in Alappuzha District, Kerala, and falls under the Thiruvananthapuram railway division of the Southern Railway zone, Indian Railways.

Railway stations in Alappuzha district
Railway stations opened in 1989
1989 establishments in Kerala
Thiruvananthapuram railway division